Karan Amin (born 21 June 1989) is an Indian professional footballer who plays as a left back for Odisha in Indian Super League. He is also a football agent.

Career
Born in Mumbai, Maharashtra, Amin was part of the youth teams of I-League clubs Mahindra United, Air India, and Mumbai. He then went on to represent Mumbai and DSK Shivajians for their senior sides in local tournaments.

In 2014, Amin was announced as part of the PIFA side that would participate in the I-League 2nd Division. Almost four years later, on 23 January 2018, Amin was signed by Jamshedpur of the Indian Super League after a trial with the club. Amin made his professional debut with the club on 2 April 2018 in their Super Cup match against Minerva Punjab. He came on as a 74th-minute substitute for Jamshedpur as they won the match on penalties.

Football agent
As well as being a professional footballer, Amin is also a football agent who founded his own agency, named Pro Elite, in 2017.

Career statistics

References

External links 
 Jamshedpur FC Profile

1989 births
Living people
People from Mumbai
Indian footballers
Mahindra United FC players
Air India FC players
Mumbai FC players
Jamshedpur FC players
Association football defenders
Footballers from Mumbai
DSK Shivajians FC players